James Savage (born December 18, 1969), better known by his stage name Jayo Felony, is an American rapper from southeast San Diego, California.

Career
In 1994 Jayo Felony was signed to the label owned by Jam Master Jay from RUN DMC called Jam Master Jay Records. That year, Jayo Felony released his debut album, Take a Ride. In 1998, he released his follow-up album, Whatcha Gonna Do? on Def Jam. It featured rappers like Method Man, DMX, Mack 10, WC, Redman, Kokane, Ice Cube, E-40 and 8 Ball & MJG.

In 1999, he released Underground which features a guest appearance by San Diego rapper The Toven on the song "Du Lo Gang". There was talk of releasing a fourth album, Hotter Than Fish Grease, in 2000, but the project was not released for unknown reasons. In 2001, His fourth studio album Crip Hop was released and had multiple guest appearances. Jayo Felony's fifth studio album self-titled James Savage was released late 2019 on the Open Bar Entertainment label. That same year, he made his acting debut in the WorldStarHipHop mini series Broken Ground

Discography

Studio albums
 Take a Ride (1995)
 Whatcha Gonna Do? (1998)
 Underground (1999)
 Crip Hop (2001)
 We on on Purpose (2011)
 James Savage (2019)

Mixtape albums
 Hoodinvasion (2020) 
 In the Trenches (2020)

Mixtapes
 Too the Nec Time Is Bread (2007)

Collaboration albums
Criminal Activity with Criminalz (2001)
 Criminal Intent with Spice 1 (2007)

External links

References

1969 births
Living people
21st-century American male musicians
21st-century American rappers
African-American male rappers
Crips
Gangsta rappers
G-funk artists
JMJ Records artists
Rappers from San Diego
21st-century African-American musicians
20th-century African-American people